Muhammad Helmi Wafiy bin Muhammad Ammar Naim, previously known as Suhaimi Anak Sulau (born March 3, 1996) is a Bruneian footballer who plays for Panchor Murai FC as a defender.

Club career
Suhaimi played youth football with Muara Vella FC, and was in Majra FC's books in 2014 when they played only 9 games in the Brunei Super League before withdrawing from the league. For the 2015 season, he played for Tabuan Muda in preparation for the 28th SEA Games held in Singapore. Wijaya FC signed him at the beginning of the 2016 season.

Suhaimi transferred to Panchor Murai FC of the Brunei Premier League in 2017. He scored his first goal against IKLS FC on 14 May. At the conclusion of the Premier League season, he moved to Indera SC for the remaining matches of the 2017 Brunei Super League. He scored his first goal for Indera against former team Wijaya FC on 3 February 2018.

In early February 2018, Brunei's professional club DPMM FC announced the signing of Suhaimi on their website, alongside Haimie Anak Nyaring, Abdul Hariz Herman and Abdul Azizi Ali Rahman. He officially signed to terms on 13 February. Under Brazilian coach Rene Weber, he made his debut on 7 April at left-back in a 4–2 victory against Home United. He swiftly became Weber's first-choice left-back in the team, earning plaudits for his strength in that position.

Suhaimi scored his first goal for DPMM in a 2–2 draw at home against Balestier Khalsa on 7 July 2018.

After leaving DPMM in 2020, Suhaimi joined Hoist FT of the Belait District League and scored on his debut.

International career
Suhaimi's first involvement with the national team setup was at the 2013 AFF U-19 Youth Championship held in Indonesia, where Brunei spearheaded by 15-year-old Prince Faiq Bolkiah conceded 30 goals in 5 matches to finish rock bottom of their group. The following year, he was ever-present for Brunei under-21 for their unsuccessful defence of the Hassanal Bolkiah Trophy that Brunei had won in 2012.

Suhaimi played for the under-23s at the 2016 AFC U-23 Championship qualification in March where they lost all three games. Furthermore, two months later, he competed in the 28th SEA Games in Singapore where he managed to play in all 5 matches that Brunei were involved in. He was called up for the 2018 AFC U-23 Championship qualification matches held in Myanmar on July 2017 and played twice, followed by the 2017 SEA Games held in Malaysia where he made three appearances.

Suhaimi made his international debut for Brunei on 3 November 2015 in a friendly against Cambodia, which they lost 1–6.

Suhaimi accepted a callup by the national team for the 2022 World Cup qualification matches against Mongolia in June 2019. He was able to start both games due to the absence of Abdul Mu'iz Sisa who had been the regular left-back for Adrian Pennock's DPMM side. A 2-1 win for the national team at the Hassanal Bolkiah National Stadium was not enough for the Wasps to qualify to the next round of the double qualification process for the 2022 World Cup and the 2023 Asian Cup, as the round finished 2-3 on aggregate to Mongolia.

Honours
DPMM FC
 Singapore Premier League: 2019

Personal life
Suhaimi converted to Islam in May 2022, choosing the Islamic name Helmi Wafiy.

References

External links

Living people
1996 births
Converts to Islam
Bruneian footballers
Brunei international footballers
Association football defenders
DPMM FC players
Wijaya FC players
Indera SC players
Competitors at the 2017 Southeast Asian Games
Southeast Asian Games competitors for Brunei